The Ranganation is a British comedy show hosted by Romesh Ranganathan and broadcast on BBC Two. Ranganathan joins a group of 25 members of the public, including his mother, to discuss news events of the week. Two celebrity guests are also featured. The first series of six 45-minute episodes premiered on 19 May 2019. The second series of six episodes was filmed remotely due to the COVID-19 pandemic and first aired on 10 May 2020.

Production
A pilot was filmed on 20 May 2018, produced by Zeppotron. The first series was commissioned in August 2018. It consisted of six weekly 45-minute episodes, beginning on 19 May 2019 and ending on 23 June 2019.

Ranganathan said that he wanted the programme to be a "topical show, not a political show". He said that the casting focused on recruiting a diverse group of "regular people who are opinionated and passionate", and that he enjoyed the honesty of the panellists. Asked who his ideal guest would be in 2018, Ranganathan said it would be Justin Trudeau if he was British, or Idris Elba. When asked again in 2020, he suggested Patrick Stewart.

The second series of six episodes aired in May 2020, during the COVID-19 pandemic. It was one of several topical British shows to be filmed and hosted by each participant remotely from their home, along with Have I Got News for You, The Mash Report and The Last Leg. Ranganathan filmed in his garage, requiring him to remove DJ equipment he bought to learn how to disc jockey during the pandemic. On Sunday, 10 May 2020 at 9:15p.m., the first episode aired. The production aimed to incorporate a mixture of topics, despite homogeneous pandemic news coverage.

On 18 January 2021, the BBC Press office announced the third series of The Ranganation would return that February. While Ranganathan was filmed from a studio, the guests participated from home. A fourth series began in October 2021. Following the relaxation of social distancing guidelines in the summer, Ranganathan and celebrity guests record in the studio while members still contribute remotely.

Awards and nominations

Episodes

Series 1

Series 2

Series 3

Series 4

Series 5

Topics 
The first series included a wide variety of discussions including:

 Episode 1: Do you wash your legs in the shower?
Episode 2: Should plastic straws be banned?
Episode 3: Should homework be banned?
 Episode 4: Do you believe in UFOs?
 Episode 5: The staggering number of UK adults sleeping with a soft toy
 Episode 6: Trying to answer stupid job interview questions

Series members 
Each series of The Ranganation includes a diverse cross-section of the public with each member having a unique nickname. Some notable participants include Romesh's mum, Scott Caizley under the nickname OMG PHD, and Param Singh who is Wheeler Dealer.

Series 1 
In the first series, 29 people appeared on the show: Vlogger, Vicars Daughter, Privileged, Yes Miss, Football Mad, OMG PHD, Lord Dave, Selfie Queen, EcoVegan, Wannabe MP, Mindful, Oxbridge, Dog Father, Technophobe, Table for One, Small Town Girl, Ex Banker, Gen Z, Wheeler Dealer, The Skipper, Single Dad, You're History, Witness the Fitness, Romesh's Mum, Never Voted, Granny To Be, Pride of Wales, Comic Book Guy, and Green Fingers.

Series 2 
Series two included 25 members from the public: Romesh's mum, Craft Beard, Privileged, You're History, Never Voted, Lord Dave, Small Town Girl, Pride of Wales, Ex Banker, Mani-Pedi, Vlogger, Glam Gran, Wheeler Dealer, Technophobe, Metalhead, Old Bill, Green Fingers, Gen Z, Football Mad, Watch Your Language, Wine Buff, The Dogfather, Oxbridge, The Skipper, and Comic Book Guy.

Series 3 
The third series included 20 members from the public including Romesh's mum, Old Bill, The Dogfather, You're History, Never Voted, Lord Dave, Small Town Girl, Ex Banker, Pride of Wales, Oxbridge, Country Life (New Member), Vlogger, Wheeler Dealer, Technophobe, Gen Z, Picture This, Football Mad, Watch Your Language, The Skipper, Comic Book Guy, Metalhead, Glam Gran, and Folk Hero.

The display screen also changed to show the current speaker in the centre with the other people appearing around them. The central talking member still appears in the smaller windows around them.

Series 4 
The Ranganation series 4 has included 22 members from the public including Romesh's mum, Vlogger, You're History, The Dogfather, Never Voted, Lord Dave, Small Town Girl, Pride of Wales, Folk Hero, Technophobe, Wheeler Dealer, Country Life, Renaissance Man, Oxbridge, Chippy Tea, Ex Banker, Glam Gran, Football Mad, Metalhead, Watch Your Language, Comic Book Guy, Flying Circus, and Gen Z.

Notes

References

External links
 
 
 

2010s British comedy television series
2020s British comedy television series
2019 British television series debuts
BBC television comedy
English-language television shows
Television series by Zeppotron
Television series by Banijay
Television shows shot at BBC Elstree Centre